In enzymology, a triphosphoribosyl-dephospho-CoA synthase is an enzyme that catalyzes the chemical reaction

ATP + 3-dephospho-CoA  2'-(5"-triphosphoribosyl)-3'-dephospho-CoA + adenine

Thus, the two substrates of this enzyme are ATP and 3-dephospho-CoA, whereas its two products are 2'-(5''-triphosphoribosyl)-3'-dephospho-CoA and adenine.

This enzyme belongs to the family of transferases, specifically those transferring non-standard substituted phosphate groups.  The systematic name of this enzyme class is ATP:3-dephospho-CoA 5"-triphosphoribosyltransferase. Other names in common use include 2'-(5"-triphosphoribosyl)-3-dephospho-CoA synthase, ATP:dephospho-CoA 5-triphosphoribosyl transferase, and CitG.  This enzyme participates in two-component system - general.

References

 
 

EC 2.7.8
Enzymes of unknown structure